Ander Capa Rodríguez (born 8 February 1992) is a Spanish professional footballer who plays for Athletic Bilbao as a right-back or a winger.

He played mainly with Eibar during his career, representing the club in three levels of Spanish football including the top division. Over seven seasons, he played 214 competitive matches and scored 15 goals. He joined Athletic Bilbao in 2018, winning the 2020–21 Supercopa de España.

Club career

Eibar
Capa was born in Portugalete, Biscay, Basque Country. He played youth football with local Danok Bat CF before signing for SD Eibar, making his senior debut in the 2011–12 season with the reserves in Tercera División.

In July 2012, Capa was promoted to the first team after appearing once with the main squad in 2011–12. In the following campaign, he played 24 matches and scored five goals (adding six games and two goals in the playoffs) as the Armeros returned to the Segunda División after a four-year absence.

Capa played his first professional match on 18 August 2013, starting in a 2–1 away win against Real Jaén. He scored his first goal on 28 September, but in a 3–2 loss at Sporting de Gijón. He appeared in a further 30 games while netting once during the season, being promoted to La Liga for the first time ever.

Capa made his debut in the top flight on 24 August 2014, starting in a 1–0 home victory over Real Sociedad. He scored his first goal in the competition on 8 December, his side's last in a 5–2 home rout of UD Almería.

During the 2015 pre-season, Capa was converted from a winger into a right-back by new manager José Luis Mendilibar. On 19 November of that year, with the club still in the top tier and him as an undisputed starter, he renewed his contract until 2018.

Athletic Bilbao
On 1 September 2017, Capa agreed to join former youth club Athletic Bilbao for four years, with the deal being made effective in July 2018. He scored his first goal for them on 10 November 2019, netting the 2–1 winner in the final minutes of the home fixture against Levante UD through a volley from outside the box; he also provided the assist for the equaliser by Iker Muniain in the same game.

Having previously been a regular starter, Capa made only one competitive appearance in the 2021–22 campaign under head coach Marcelino García Toral, and that consisted of just a few minutes as a late substitute. Subsequently, he was highly critical of the manager, and with no agreement reached on a new contract – even after negotiations resumed when Jon Uriarte was elected as the new president and Ernesto Valverde was brought as the new coach – he appeared set to leave the club. However, eventually a new deal was reached in July 2022, with the player staying at San Mamés for at least one more season and potentially a second if targets were met.

Career statistics

Club

Honours
Eibar
Segunda División: 2013–14

Athletic Bilbao
Supercopa de España: 2020–21
Copa del Rey runner-up: 2019–20, 2020–21

References

External links

  

1992 births
Living people
People from Portugalete
Sportspeople from Biscay
Spanish footballers
Footballers from the Basque Country (autonomous community)
Association football defenders
Association football wingers
Association football utility players
La Liga players
Segunda División players
Segunda División B players
Tercera División players
Danok Bat CF players
SD Eibar footballers
Athletic Bilbao footballers
Basque Country international footballers